Congregation Ahavath Torah is a Modern Orthodox synagogue in Englewood, New Jersey.

History
The synagogue traces its roots back to 1895, and was the first synagogue in Bergen County, New Jersey. Over the years it has been located on Liberty Road, Drurie Avenue, Humphrey Street, Englewood Avenue, and now Broad Avenue. In 1995 the synagogue had 540 families. In 2016, in opened a mikveh with two pools. In 2017 it had about 750 families.

In 1895, the idea of an orthodox synagogue in Englewood was conceived by a nucleus of eight pioneering families who laid the groundwork for the congregation.

In the absence of a synagogue building, after acquiring a Sefer Torah for $130, the founding group began conducting services in each other's homes. They later rented space to accommodate their minyanim on Armory Street, and subsequently on Durie Avenue, an area of town where most of the Jewish families resided.

By 1911, Ahavath Torah had increased its membership to fifty families, becoming a center of Jewish activity in northern New Jersey.

The steady influx of Jewish families soon rendered the existing synagogue facility inadequate and an old church building was acquired on Englewood Avenue for $1,500. This became the seat of Ahavath Torah until 1958, when it became clear that the needs of the congregants, and changes in demography necessitated a larger house of worship. The estate of Baroness Cassel Van Doorn at 240 Broad Avenue was purchased for $55,000, and they embarked upon the construction of a new sanctuary. The relocation was celebrated by a march through the streets of Englewood with the Sifrei Torah being transported to their new home.

Rabbi Isaac Swift, who became the congregation's spiritual leader in 1960, led the community through a period of growth and expansion until his retirement twenty-four years later. In an interview in 1982, Rabbi Swift characterized the community by stating: "The loveliness of Englewood is not the uniformity, but the unity of the community."

In 1984, Rabbi Shmuel Goldin, currently the Rabbi Emeritus, became the rabbi. 

Rabbi Chaim Poupko became Senior Rabbi in 2017 following 14 years at Congregation Ahavath Torah holding positions of Rabbinic Intern, Assistant Rabbi, and Associate Rabbi. 

Among the number of Shabbat morning minyanim, the shul includes a Sephardic minyan known as the Benaroya Sephardic Center. Rabbi Mordy Kuessous is the Associate Rabbi for the Benaroya Sephardic Center.

References

External links

Synagogues in New Jersey
Englewood, New Jersey
Religious buildings and structures in New Jersey
Modern Orthodox synagogues in the United States
Religious organizations established in 1895
1895 establishments in New Jersey